Rhizophagus brunneus is a species of root-eating beetle in the family Monotomidae. It is found in Central America and North America.

Subspecies
These two subspecies belong to the species Rhizophagus brunneus:
 Rhizophagus brunneus brunneus Horn, 1879
 Rhizophagus brunneus fenyesi Méquignon, 1913

References

Further reading

 
 
 

Monotomidae
Articles created by Qbugbot
Beetles described in 1879